Kutia or kutya is a ceremonial grain dish with sweet gravy traditionally served by Eastern Orthodox Christians and Byzantine Catholic Christians predominantly in Ukraine, Belarus and Russia during the Christmas - Feast of Jordan holiday season or as part of a funeral feast. The word with a descriptor is also used to describe the eves of Christmas, New Year, and Feast of Jordan days.

Etymology
The word kutia is a borrowing from the Greek language κουκκί (bean) or κόκκος (grain).

Description

Ukraine 
In Ukraine kutіa is one of the two essential ritual dishes at the Ukrainian Christmas Eve supper (also known as Svyata vecherya). The ritual significance of kutia, as well as uzvar, is quite ancient. Ukrainian ethnographer Fedir Vovk traces the origins of these dishes to the Neolithic era. Before dinner, the kutia is placed in the corner ("kut") under the icons,  the most honorable place in the house. The pot with the kutia was to stand in this  corner from Rizdvo (Christmas) to the Old New Year (January 14). There is also a custom of sending children with kutia to relatives, usually grandparents and godparents. After dinner, the kutia is left on the table for the whole night  with spoons for the dead ancestors, "so that our relatives would have dinner and not be angry with us." The religious nature of the dish is emphasized by an ancient custom, when the head of the family approached the window or went out into the yard with a spoonful of kutia and, addressing the frost, invited him three times to take part in dinner with the family. When the frost does not appear, he is advised not to appear, not to do harm to crops, etc.: "Frost, frost, come to us to eat kutia, and if you don't come, don't come for the rye, wheat and other crops."

Kutia is the first out of twelve dishes served for Svyata vecherya to be tasted. The head of the family takes the first spoon of the kutia, raises it up and calls out to the souls of departed family members to join them on this night.  He then tastes the kutia, and throws the rest of the spoonful up to the ceiling.  As many kernels of grain as stick to the ceiling, there should be swarms of bees and newborn cattle in the coming year.  As many poppy seeds as remain on the ceiling, each hen should lay as many eggs in the coming year. Everyone present eats a spoonful of kutia, after which the other dishes are brought out and eaten.

The main ingredients used to make traditional kutia are wheatberries, poppy seeds and honey. At times, walnuts, dried fruit and raisins are added as well. Kutia is a Lenten dish and no milk or egg products can be used. There are known kutia recipes that use pearl barley or millet instead of wheatberries.

Kolyvo is a Ukrainian ritual dish similar to kutia, but includes no poppy seeds. Kolyvo is served at remembrance services.

Other countries 
A dish of boiled grains (usually wheat berries) mixed with honey, nuts, spices, and a few other ingredients is traditional in other countries as well:

 Bulgaria – kolivo
 Greece – koliva
 Lebanon, Palestine and Jordan – ameh masslouk or snuniye
 Romania – colivă
 Russia – (also) sochivo
 Serbia – koljivo (to wit: sacrifice), or simply: žito (ie, wheat)
 Sicily – cuccìa
 Syria – sliha or burbara (for Eid il-Bur-bara, St. Barbara's Feast throughout the Middle East)

Somewhat similar, but with a different origin, and somewhat different ingredients, is the Islamic, especially Turkish, sweet dish of Ashure.

See also

Frumenty
Koliva
List of desserts
Memorial service in the Eastern Orthodox Church
Slava (tradition)

References

External links 

 Video-recipe of Kutia with English subtitles

Christmas food
Poppy seeds
Russian cuisine
Slavic cuisine
Ukrainian cuisine
Wheat dishes
Winter traditions